Established in 2011, the Renminbi Qualified Foreign Institutional Investor (RQFII) program is a policy initiative that allows foreign investors who hold the RQFII quota to invest directly in Mainland China’s bond and equity markets. The program represents a continued loosening of China’s capital controls and departure from its predecessor QFII. The RQFII program relaxes existing restrictions on currency settlement, adds permissible asset classes, and expands investor eligibility. The current RQFII relevant jurisdiction applies to financial organizations registered in Hong Kong, Singapore, the United Kingdom, France, Korea, Germany, Australia, Switzerland, Canada, the United States and Luxembourg.

History
As the second largest economy in the world, China represents a key driver of global growth. Although the Renminbi has been elevated to reserve currency status, only 10.3% of global trade is done through the currency (as of 2015).
 Because of this imbalance, the Chinese government has undertaken measures in recent years to open the country’s capital account.

The Qualified Foreign Institutional Investor (QFII) program was launched in 2002. Primary aims were letting financial institutions outside China invest in China’s stock and bond markets. However, it was limited to certain financial institutions such as commercial banks, securities companies, insurance companies, and securities with no less than $500 million USD.

Acknowledging that further action was necessary, RQFII was jointly established in December 2011 by the China Securities Regulatory Commission, the People’s Bank of China, and the State Administration of Foreign Exchange. It allows subsidiaries of domestic fund management companies and securities companies in Hong Kong to invest in the mainland securities market. Initially, RMB 20 billion of quota was divided among 21 selected financial services firms in Hong Kong. The available quota was increased steadily throughout 2012 during the rollout of Phases II and III of the plan, rising from RMB 50 billion to RMB 70 billion in quota and topping out to 270 RMB billion by the year’s end. Launching Phase IV of the program in 2013 allowed for inclusion of firms based in Singapore and London. 2014 saw inclusion of firms based in Paris and Taiwan.

Available Instruments
The RQFII scheme applies to the following instruments:

 Exchange-listed or transferred A-share (not including the New Third Board)
 Bonds, warrants, and inter-bank market fixed income products (not including repo, ABS, etc.)
 Mutual funds and aggregate asset management plans issued by mutual fund managers or brokerage houses (not including subsidiaries of these institutions or priority-inferior funds, etc.)
 Stock index futures 
 Stock IPOs, issuance of convertible bonds, placements and additional offerings, etc.
 Other instruments approved by CSRC

Eligible Applicants

The RQFII program is open to two categories of investors:
 Applicants in the Relevant Jurisdictions that are subsidiaries of Chinese fund management companies, Chinese securities companies, Chinese commercial banks, and Chinese insurance companies
 Financial institutions that are registered in a Relevant Jurisdiction and with a principal place of business in a Relevant Jurisdiction

The RQFII eligible jurisdictions are currently Hong Kong, Singapore, the United Kingdom, France, Korea, Germany, Australia, Switzerland, Canada, the United States, and Luxembourg.

RQFII vs QFII

Top 20 RQFII Quota Holders

References

Investment in China
Institutional investors
2011 establishments in China